Nobonob (Nobanob, Nobnob), also known as Butelkud-Guntabak or Garuh (cf. closely related Garus), is a Papuan language of Papua New Guinea. The language is expanding slightly. Ari (Ati, A’i) is a dialect.

Phonology

Vowels (orthographic)

Consonants (orthographic)

External links 
 Materials on Nobonob are included in the open access collections AC1 and CVL1 held by Paradisec.

References

Hanseman languages
Languages of Madang Province